Fake Fruit Factory is a 1986 American experimental documentary film by Chick Strand.

Summary
The film documents young women making artificial fruits and vegetables in a small factory in Mexico with a gringo boss and his Mexican wife (latter owning the factory). The main focuses are the color, music and movement involved and the constant gossip about what the women think of men.

Legacy
It was selected to the United States National Film Registry in 2011 as "culturally, historically, or aesthetically significant".

Availability
Appeared on the DVD Treasures IV: American Avant-Garde Film, 1947-1986.

References

External links
 
 Fake Fruit Factory on Canyon Cinema

American avant-garde and experimental films
American documentary films
1986 films
United States National Film Registry films
1980s avant-garde and experimental films
Films shot in Mexico
1980s Spanish-language films
1980s American films